The Champions Cup (JPN G-1, formerly the Japan Cup Dirt until 2013) is a thoroughbred horse race contested in Japan in early December. It is run for three-year-olds and older at a distance of 1,800 meters. In recent years, the race has followed the Japan Cup on the Japanese racing calendar.

Race information 
 Racecourse:  Chukyo Racecourse 
 Distance:  1,800 meters (About 9. furlongs), Dirt, Right-handed 
 Qualification to run:  3-y-o & Up 
 Weight:  3-y-o colts & geldings 55 kg 
 3-y-o fillies 53 kg 
 4-y-o & up horses & geldings 57 kg 
 4-y-o & up mares 55 kg 
 Safety Factor: 16 (There will be a maximum of 8 foreign-trained starters)

2008 changes 
The race was moved from Tokyo Racecourse to Hanshin Racecourse in 2008. The Japan Cup Dirt had been overshadowed by its turf counterpart (the Japan Cup) in recent years, because turf racing in Japan typically remains more popular and attracts better horses. Attendance for the 2007 Japan Cup Dirt was 56,052, while the attendance for the turf race the following day was 103,545.

With the move to Hanshin, the Japan Cup Dirt was shortened from its original distance of 2,100 meters (about  furlongs) to 1,800 meters (about 9 furlongs). Now run one week after the Japan Cup, the Japan Cup Dirt shares the weekend with the "World Super Jockeys Series" featuring jockeys from around the world.

2014 changes 
The Japan Cup Dirt was moved to Chukyo Racecourse in 2014 and renamed the Champions Cup. According to the Japan Racing Association, the decision to make changes to the race was because of a lack of international participation. The new Champions Cup race will be run left-handed, as opposed to the right turns run since the race moved from Tokyo to Hanshin in 2008. The purse of the race will be reduced to ¥94 million - compared to ¥130 million for the 2013 running - and it will no longer be an invitational race. The 2014 running is scheduled for Sunday, December 7.

Purse 
(For the 2007 running)

Total JPN  ¥277,900,000 (U.S$. 2,416,000) 
 1st  JPN ¥130,000,000 (U.S$. 1,103,000) 
 2nd  JPN ¥52,000,000 (U.S$. 452,000) 
 3rd  JPN ¥33,000,000 (U.S$. 286,000) 
 4th  JPN ¥20,000,000 (U.S$. 173,000) 
 5th  JPN ¥13,000,000 (U.S$. 113,000)

Like counterpart Japan Cup, as being one of the 4 GI races in Japan Autumn International Series since 2008, a bonus is added to the top 3 if they are not trained in Japan, and raced in one of the following races and finished likewise in same year. If multiple bonus applies, only the highest one counts.

Winners 

2000, 2001, 2003–2007: Tokyo Racecourse, 2,100 meters, counter-clockwise (left-handed)
2002: Nakayama Racecourse, 1,800 meters, clockwise (right-handed)
2008–2013: Hanshin Racecourse, 1,800 meters, clockwise
2014–present (scheduled): Chukyo Racecourse, 1,800 meters, counter-clockwise

See also
 Horse racing in Japan
 List of Japanese flat horse races

References
Racing Post: 

External links 
Horse Racing in Japan - Japan Racing Association

Open middle distance horse races
Dirt races in Japan